Barbra Higgins (born 22 July 1957) is a Panamanian fencer. She competed in the women's individual foil event at the 1984 Summer Olympics.

References

External links
 

1957 births
Living people
Panamanian female foil fencers
Olympic fencers of Panama
Fencers at the 1984 Summer Olympics